Living in the USA is the ninth studio album by American singer Linda Ronstadt, released in 1978. The album was Ronstadt's third and final No. 1 on the Billboard 200 album chart.

Release
The album was originally released by Asylum in the LP format in September 1978 (catalog number 155 or 6E-155). Subsequently, in 1990, Asylum released the album on cassette (TCS-155) and in the CD format (2-155).

In addition to the standard 1978 release, collector's-item editions of the LP were made in the same time period of the album in red vinyl (catalog number K53085) and also of a picture disc (catalog number DP 401) featuring a photograph of Ronstadt lacing up the roller skating boots that she is wearing on the front cover (this photograph is also included on the record sleeve in the standard release).

Single releases and radio play
The album's first single release was Chuck Berry's "Back in the USA" which reached number 11 on the Cash Box Top 100 and number 16 on the Billboard Hot 100.  (It was listed at number 1 on many Album Rock playlists.)  The disc's biggest success was Ronstadt's version of Smokey Robinson's "Ooh Baby Baby" (featuring alto-sax work from David Sanborn) that hit number 7 Pop and number 2 Easy Listening as well as the Country and even the Soul chart. "Just One Look" and "Alison" later became hit singles for Ronstadt as well, while "All That You Dream" and Warren Zevon's "Mohammed's Radio" were popular tracks on Album-Oriented Radio stations.

Although not released as a single, Ronstadt's version of "Love Me Tender" was edited together with the original version of the song by Elvis Presley, creating a duet between the two famous singers that was played by many radio stations at the time.

Critical reception
The album received largely positive reviews at the time of release. Ronstadt covered her last Warren Zevon song for this album ("Mohammed's Radio"). The album largely consisted of material that had previously been recorded and released by other artists including covers of songs written and performed previously by Little Feat, Elvis Presley and Elvis Costello.

At the time, Ronstadt's cover of Elvis Costello's "Alison" was criticized by Costello himself after he heard her version of the song, although he did admit he "liked the money." Ronstadt had her management reach out to Costello and ask if he had any other material she could cover. He responded by sending her three songs that she recorded for her follow-up album. After the release of Mad Love, Ronstadt's follow-up album with the three Costello songs she solicited, Costello again had negative comments about her versions of his songs. In later years, Costello praised Ronstadt and apologized for the harshness of his comments.

Track listing

Personnel 
 Linda Ronstadt – lead vocals, backing vocals (3, 5, 9)
 Dan Dugmore – electric guitar (1, 3, 7) pedal steel guitar (4-6, 8-9)
 Waddy Wachtel – electric guitar (1, 3-8), backing vocals (1, 6, 10), acoustic guitar (9, 10)
 Don Grolnick – acoustic piano (1, 2, 3, 5, 7, 8, 9) electric piano (4, 5, 6), organ (5, 10)
 Kenny Edwards – bass guitar (1, 3-9), backing vocals (1, 3, 9)
 Russ Kunkel – drums (1, 3-9), congas (5, 9)
 Mike Mainieri – vibraphone (2), arrangements (2)
 Peter Asher – backing vocals (1), cowbell (3, 9), tambourine (3, 6, 9), shaker (6), sleigh bells (6)
 David Sanborn – alto saxophone (4, 7)
 Pat Henderson – backing vocals (3, 8)
 Sherlie Matthews – backing vocals (3, 8)
 Andrew Gold – backing vocals (4)
 Jim Gilstrap – backing vocals (7)
 John Lehman – backing vocals (7)
 David Lasley – backing vocals (9)
 Arnold McCuller – backing vocals (9)

Production 
 Peter Asher – producer
 Val Garay – recording, mixing
 George Ybarra – recording assistant, mix assistant
 Jan Michael Alejandro – technician
 Harold Jones – technician
 Doug Sax – mastering at The Mastering Lab (Hollywood, California).
 Kosh – art direction, design 
 Jim Shea – photography

Charts

Weekly charts

Year-end charts

Certifications

References

1978 albums
Linda Ronstadt albums
Albums produced by Peter Asher
Asylum Records albums
Rhino Records albums